The 2012 Welsh local elections took place on 3 May 2012 to elect members of all twenty-two local authorities in Wales. They were held alongside other local elections in the United Kingdom. The previous elections were held in 2008.

The Labour Party made gains at the expense of the other three major parties and of independents. Labour won majority control of ten councils—up eight from the 2008 local elections—while two remained under the control of independents and nine councils had no overall control.

The Welsh Government announced that elections for Anglesey council would be postponed to May 2013.

Results

For comparative purposes, the table above shows changes since 2008 excluding Anglesey, which was not up for election.

Councils

Isle of Anglesey
Elections to the Isle of Anglesey County Council were postponed for a year, to May 2013, because of a review of electoral arrangements for the island. The result of the postponed election saw the Independents lose their majority, with Plaid Cymru hoping to form a coalition with Labour.

Opinion polling

Notes

References

External links

 
2012 elections in the United Kingdom
Welsh local elections by year
2012 United Kingdom local elections
Council elections in the United Kingdom
May 2012 events in the United Kingdom